Zanjan Province, or Zangan Province (Ostân-e Zanjân), is one of the 31 provinces of Iran, whose capital is the city of Zanjan. It is a mountainous province with close to 22,000 km2 of land placed in Iran's Region 3. Two-thirds of the people of the province live in the cities, mainly the capital and Abhar.

At the time of the National Census of 2006, the population of the province was 942,818 in 235,771 households. The following census in 2011 counted 1,015,734 inhabitants living in 286,806 households. At the most recent census of 2016, the population had increased to 1,057,461 in 321,983 households.

History 

In Ptolemy's Geography, the city is referred to as Aganzana. It is said that the Sassanid king Ardashir I of Persia, reconstructed the city and called it Shahin, but later it was renamed Zangan: the present name is the Arabicized form.

In past times Zanjan's name was Khamseh, which means "province with five tribes". Zanjan Province incorporates areas of the former Gerrus Province.

Former names 

At least since the era of Zand dynasty, Zanjan and its surrounding areas were called "Khamseh." For instance, in a book named "Mojmal al-Tawarikh-e Golestaneh", while it talks about the events of Karim Khan Zand era, it mentions the "Mahal-e Khamseh" which literally means "Khamseh areas" to refer to the areas of Zanjan province. Use of Khamseh for Zanjan could precedent the Zand era, as after the death of Nader shah and collapse of the great unification of Afshar tribes, the tribe of "Afshar-e Khamseh" returned to the "Mahal-e Khamseh". So the tribe name, was already containing the suffix of "Khamseh", since the era of Nader and possibly before they leave the Zanjan area to accompany Nader, therefore it can be concluded that at least since the time of Nader and Afsharids, the area was called as "Khamseh".

It has been said that when Karim Khan Zand left Ardabil and Khalkhal to suppress Zaki Khan in Kashan, he entered the Zanjan, and in Abhar, he delegated the governorship of three areas of "Mahal-e Khamseh" to Zolfagharkhan-e Sultan Irlooy-e Afshar, and as such this is another sign for the area being named at the time of Zands as "Khamseh".

Later at the time of Qajars also Zanjan province, was called as Khamseh. Etemad Al-Saltaneh in the book "Esker-ol-Tavarikh", when talks about Agha Mohammad Khan Qajar just before the formation of Qajar dynasty, uses the title of "Hakem-e Khamseh" (Governor of Khamseh). In addition, Mirza Abolhasan Khan Shirazi, in his travelogue in the year 1229 Hijri (around 1814 AC) mentions the "Khamseh". Among the European travellers, the first person who used the name "Khamseh" for the province where Zanjan city was located, was Pierre Amédée Jaubert who was sent by Napoleon Bonaparte to visit Fath Ali Shah's court, and in the year 1804 AC visited the Zanjan city.

Geography 

Zanjan has an area of 22,164 km2, occupying 1.34% of the Iranian territory. The average population density in Zanjan is 47 people per km2. In the northwest of Iran, Zanjan covers joint borders with seven provinces: East Azerbaijan, West Azerbaijan, Hamadan, Kurdistan, Gilan, Ghazvin and Ardabil.

The average annual rainfall in the first month of spring stands at 72 millimetres, while in the second month of summer, it slips to a meagre 3.6 mm. The rate of humidity in the morning stands by average at 74% and at noon at 43%.

The Zanjan River is the only major river in the region.

Climate 
Zanjan has a highland climate characterized by cold, snowy weather in the mountains and moderate climate in the plains in wintertime. In the summers, the weather is warm. The average maximum temperature of Zanjan is around 27 °C, whereas the average minimum temperature stands at −19 °C. Meanwhile, the temperature rises to 32 °C on hot days; it drops to −27 °C on icy days.

Administrative divisions

Cities 

According to the 2016 census, 711,177 people (over 67% of the population of Zanjan province) live in the following cities: Ab Bar 8,091, Abhar 99,285, Armaghankhaneh 2,149, Chavarzaq 1,733, Dandi 4,778, Garmab 3,823, Halab 956, Hidaj 13,840, Karasf 3,083, Khorramdarreh 55,368, Mah Neshan 5,487, Nik Pey 455, Nurbahar 3,644, Qeydar 34,921, Sain Qaleh, 12,989, Sohrevard 6,991, Sojas 7,037, Soltaniyeh 7,638, Zanjan 430,871, Zarrin Rud 5,664, and Zarrinabad 2,374.

Demographics 
Azerbaijanians are the main ethnic group in the province followed by Tats. Like every other region of Iran, the lingua franca is Persian.

Agriculture and industry 
Agriculture is the principal occupation, and crops include rice, corn (maize), oilseeds, fruits, and potatoes. Poultry, cattle, and sheep are raised. In the region Zanjan is known for its seedless grapes. Manufactures include bricks, cement, milled rice, and carpets. Chromium, lead, and copper are mined. In the scientific world, Zanjan is the home of IASBS, one of the most productive research centers of the country.

Zanjan is known for its handicrafts such as knives, traditional sandals called charoogh and malileh. Malileh is a handcraft made with silver wires. Zanjani artists make many things like decorative dishes and their special covers as well as silver jewelry. In ancient times, Zanjan was known for its stainless and sharp knives. But this tradition is gradually becoming extinct by the introduction of Chinese knives to the market which are cheaper and better made. Many villagers today are traditional carpet weavers.

The province economy is benefiting from its location that connects central Iran to the northwestern provinces. The railway and highway that connects Iran's capital city Tehran to Tabriz, and Turkey passes through Zanjan Province.

Higher education 

The Institute for Advanced Studies in Basic Sciences IASBS, in Zanjan city, is one of Iran's most distinguished upper-level education and research centers in the pure sciences. Zanjan is home to the University of Zanjan, Zanjan University of Medical Sciences, and Islamic Azad University of Zanjan.

References

External links 
 Read more about zanjan in "Tebyan zanjan" 
 University of Zanjan
 Islamic Azad University of Abhar
 Islamic Azad University of Zanjan
 Official website of Zanjan Governorship
 Iran Handcrafts & Handmade 
 Sultaniyeh Dome Official website
 Zanjan University of Medical Sciences 
 Zanjan City Information